Biff or BIFF may refer to:

People
 Biff (name), a given name or nickname 
 Biff (cartoon), British cartoon strip

Computer-related terms
 biff (Unix), a UNIX mail notification program.
 BIFF, also B1FF or B1ff, a pseudonym used on Usenet and Internet
 BIFF, the Binary Interchange File Format, used by Microsoft Excel

Film festivals
 Bakersfield Independent Film Festival
 Bahamas International Film Festival
 Beijing International Film Festival
 Beloit International Film Festival
 Bergen International Film Festival
 Berkshire International Film Festival
 Berlin Independent Film Festival
 Berlin International Film Festival
 Bogota International Film Festival
 Boston International Film Festival
 Boulder International Film Festival
 Brisbane International Film Festival
 Brooklyn International Film Festival, former name of the Brooklyn Film Festival
 Brussels International Film Festival (disambiguation), various film festivals in Brussels
 Busan International Film Festival, previously "Pusan International Film Festival"

Other uses
 The Bristol F.2 Fighter of World War I
 Bangsamoro Islamic Freedom Fighters an Islamic militant group based in the Southern Philippines
 WBFH, also known as The Biff, a community radio station in Bloomfield Hills, Michigan

See also
 Biff Burger, an American fast food franchise
 Elysian Fields, Texas, once known as Biff Springs
 BIF (disambiguation)